Luculia is a genus of flowering plants in the family Rubiaceae. It was described by Robert Sweet in 1826 and is currently found from the Himalayas to southern China. The species are shrubs or small trees, generally found on upland scrub and woodland or forest margins. They have large leaves from 20 to 35 cm with prominent veins carried in opposite pairs. The inflorescence is a terminal umbel or corymb of tubular/open ended white, pink or creamy flowers with 5 spreading petals. It may be from 10 to 20 cm, depending on the species.

Species

References

External links
 Luculia in the World Checklist of Rubiaceae
 Luculia at uniprot.org

Rubiaceae genera
Enigmatic Rubiaceae taxa